Vladislav Aleksandrovich Kozhemyakin (born 25 July 2001) is a Russian football player.

Club career
He made his debut in the Russian Football National League for FC Yenisey Krasnoyarsk on 27 September 2020 in a game against FC Krasnodar-2.

References

External links
 
 Profile by Russian Football National League
 

2001 births
Living people
Russian footballers
Association football defenders
FC Yenisey Krasnoyarsk players